Sanam Tehran Sports Club (Bâshgâh-e Varzeshi-ye Sanâm-e Tehrân) was an Iranian multisport club based in Tehran, Iran.

Basketball
Iranian Super League
Winners (2): 2003, 2005
Runners-up (2): 2002, 2004

West Asian Club Championships
Winners (1): 2003
Third place (1): 2004

Volleyball
Iranian Super League
Winners (4): 2001, 2002, 2004, 2005
Runners-up (2): 1999, 2003
Third place (1): 2000

Asian Club Championships
Winners (1): 2004
Runners-up (1): 2002

References

External links 
 iranvolleyball.com/

Multi-sport clubs in Iran
Sport in Tehran